Nine Inch Nails is an American industrial rock act, founded in 1988 by Trent Reznor in Cleveland, Ohio.  As its main producer, singer, songwriter, and instrumentalist, Reznor was the only official member of Nine Inch Nails until the addition of Atticus Ross in 2016.  Nine Inch Nails has received four awards from 25 nominations, including two Grammy Awards for the songs "Wish" and "Happiness in Slavery" in 1993 and 1996 respectively.  Nine Inch Nails have received two Kerrang! Awards honoring the band's overall contributions since 1988.  The band has also received nine nominations from the MTV Video Music Awards for several of its videos, including two nominations for the "Closer" video and five nominations for the "Perfect Drug" video, including Video of the Year.

Nine Inch Nails and several of its releases have also received awards and honors from the critical community.  The band was ranked as the 94th "Greatest Artist of All Time" by Rolling Stone in 2004.  Nine Inch Nails' second studio album, The Downward Spiral, has been included on several "Best Of" lists, including Rolling Stone's "500 Greatest Albums of All Time" and Spin's "100 Greatest Albums, 1985–2005".

Academy Awards

|-
| style="text-align:center;"| 2011
| The Social Network
| Best Original Score
| 
|-
| style="text-align:center;"rowspan="2"|2021
| Soul
| Best Original Score (Win with Jon Batiste)
| 
|- 
| Mank
| Best Original Score 
|

American Music Awards
The American Music Awards are awarded annually by a poll of music buyers. Nine Inch Nails has received two nominations.

|-
| style="text-align:center;"| 1994
| rowspan="2" | Nine Inch Nails
| rowspan="2" | Favorite Alternative Artist
| 
|-
| style="text-align:center;"| 1995
|

Annie Awards

Antville Music Video Awards
The Antville Music Video Awards are online awards for the best music video and music video directors of the year. They were first awarded in 2005. Nine Inch Nails has received two nominations.

|-
| rowspan="2" | 2005
| rowspan="2" | "Only"
| Worst Video 
| 
|-
| Best Video 
|

Billboard Awards
Billboard Music Awards
The Billboard Music Awards are sponsored by Billboard magazine and is held annually in December.  Nine Inch Nails has received one nomination.

|-
| style="text-align:center;"| 2005
| Nine Inch Nails
| Modern Rock Artist of the Year
| 

Billboard Music Video Awards
The Billboard Music Video Awards are sponsored by Billboard magazine. Nine Inch Nails has received two nominations.

|-
| style="text-align:center;"| 1995
| "Hurt"
| rowspan=2|Best Modern Rock Clip of the Year
| 
|-
| style="text-align:center;"| 2000
| "Starfuckers, Inc."
|

Emmy Awards

|-
| style="text-align:center;"| 2020
| Watchmen: It's Summer and We're Running Out of Ice
| Outstanding Music Composition for a Limited Series, Movie, or Special (Original Dramatic Score) 
|

D&AD Awards
Design and Art Direction (D&AD) is a British educational charity which exists to promote excellence in design and advertising. 

|-
| rowspan=2|1995
| rowspan=2|"Closer"
| Direction
| style="background:#BF8040"| Wood Pencil
|-
| Individual
| style="background:#8a8b89"| Graphite Pencil
|-
| 2006
| "Only"
| Special Effects
| style="background:#BF8040"| Wood Pencil

Golden Globe
 

|-
| style="text-align:center;"| 2011
| The Social Network
| Best Original Score – Motion Picture
|

Grammy Awards
The Grammy Awards are awarded annually by the National Academy of Recording Arts and Sciences. Nine Inch Nails has received two awards from twelve nominations.

|-
| style="text-align:center;"| 1993
| "Wish"
| Best Metal Performance
| 
|-
| style="text-align:center;"| 1995
| The Downward Spiral
| Best Alternative Performance
| 
|-
| style="text-align:center;"| 1996
| "Happiness in Slavery" (Live version as performed at Woodstock '94 music festival.)
| Best Metal Performance
| 
|-
| style="text-align:center;"| 1998
| "The Perfect Drug"
| Best Hard Rock Performance
| 
|-
| rowspan="2" style="text-align:center;"| 2000
| The Fragile
| Best Alternative Album
| 
|-
| "Starfuckers, Inc."
| Best Metal Performance
| 
|-
| style="text-align:center;"| 2001
| "Into the Void"
| Best Male Rock Vocal Performance
| 
|-
| style="text-align:center;"| 2006
| "The Hand That Feeds"
| Best Hard Rock Performance
| 
|-
| style="text-align:center;"| 2007
| "Every Day is Exactly the Same"
| Best Hard Rock Performance
| 
|-
| rowspan="2" style="text-align:center;"| 2009
| "34 Ghosts IV"
| Best Rock Instrumental Performance
| 
|-
| Ghosts I–IV
| Best Boxed or Special Limited Edition Package
| 
|-
| style="text-align:center;"| 2014
| Hesitation Marks
| Best Alternative Music Album
| 
|-

MTV Video Music Awards
The MTV Video Music Awards were established in 1984 by MTV to celebrate the music videos of the year. Nine Inch Nails has received nine nominations.

|-
| style="text-align:center;"| 
| "Wish"
| Best Metal/Hard Rock Video
| 
|-
| rowspan="2" style="text-align:center;"| 
| rowspan="2"| "Closer"
| Breakthrough Video
| 
|-
| Best Art Direction in a Video
| 
|-
| rowspan="5" style="text-align:center;"| 
| rowspan="5"| "The Perfect Drug"
| Video of the Year
| 
|-
| Best Alternative Video
| 
|-
| Best Direction in a Video
| 
|-
| Best Cinematography in a Video
| 
|-
| Best Art Direction in a Video
| 
|-
| style="text-align:center;"| 
| "Into the Void"
| Breakthrough Video
| 
|-

mtvU Woodie Awards
MTVU broadcasts its own semi-annual awards show, the Woodie Awards, which it states recognizes "the music voted best by college students.

|-
| rowspan=2|2005
| rowspan=2|"Only"
| Best Video Woodie - Live Action
| 
|-
| Best Video Woodie - Animated 
|

MVPA Awards
The MVPA Awards are annually presented by a Los Angeles-based music trade organization to honor the year's best music videos.

|-
| rowspan="4" | 2006
| rowspan="4" | "Only"
| Best Animated Video
| 
|-
| Best Director of a Male Artist 
| 
|-
| Best Rock Video 
| 
|-
| Best Special Effects
|

Kerrang! Awards
The Kerrang! Awards is an annual awards ceremony held by Kerrang!, a British rock magazine.  Nine Inch Nails has won two awards.

|-
| style="text-align:center;"| 2005
| Nine Inch Nails
| Classic Songwriter Award
| 
|-
| style="text-align:center;"| 2007
| Nine Inch Nails
| Kerrang! Icon Award
|

Polstar Concert Industry Awards
The Pollstar Concert Industry Awards is an annual award ceremony to honor artists and professionals in the concert industry. 

|-
| 1992
| Pretty Hate Machine Tour Series
| Club Tour of the Year
| 
|-
| 1995
| Self-Destruct Tour
| Small Hall Tour of the Year
| 
|-
| 1996
| Dissonance/Outside Tour (w/David Bowie)
| rowspan=2|Most Creative Stage Production 
| 
|-
| 2010
| Wave Goodbye Tour (w/Jane's Addiction)
|

Rock and Roll Hall of Fame
The Rock and Roll Hall of Fame honors artists, producers, engineers, and other notable figures who have influenced the development of rock music. Nine Inch Nails became eligible for induction in 2015. After two consecutive nominations, the band was then absent from the list of nominees for three years running. Asked about this apparent snub, Reznor responded, "I honestly couldn’t give less of a shit." The band was again nominated for 2020.

|-
| 2015
| Nine Inch Nails
| Performers 
| 
|-
| 2016
| Nine Inch Nails
| Performers 
| 
|-
| 2020
| Nine Inch Nails
| Performers 
|

Žebřík Music Awards

!Ref.
|-
| 2007
| Beside You in Time
| Best International Music DVD
| 
|

Miscellaneous awards and honors

References

General

Specific

External links
Official Nine Inch Nails website

Awards
Lists of awards received by American musician
Lists of awards received by musical group